Fray Mocho was an Argentine weekly magazine that published general interest topics. Its first number was published on May 3, 1912, with historian and journalist Carlos Correa Luna being its first director. Fray Mocho'''s staff included former collaborators of Caras y Caretas who had left the magazine in disagreement with its editorial line.

The magazine was named after José Sixto Álvarez (1858–1903), writer and journalist who was notable for his humorous texts, apart of having been the founder of Caras y Caretas. Fray Mocho published 196 issues until its closure in 1929.

History
The magazine was founded with the purpose of continuing the editorial line of Caras y Caretas that had significantly changed since the death of Sixto Alvarez in 1903. Some of Fray Mocho founders and main collaborators were Carlos Correa Luna, Spanish illustrator José María Cao, writer Luis Pardo (under the pseudonym "Luis García"), Félix Lima, painter Juan Peláez, Czech cartoonist José Friedriech,La Revista Fray Mocho y un tango dedicado by León Benarós on Todo Tango website and artist Juan Hohmann.Fray Mocho was an alternative to general-interest magazines such as Caras y Caretas or PBT, with an average of 80,000 copies printed. In 1922 the magazine added more articles about classical culture and art, ceasing the use of illustrations on its covers and adding more photographs and paintings until 1929 when it ceased to be published.

The magazine covered a wide range of topics, some of its permanent sections were theatre activities, provinces, women, Montevideo, readers' letters, children's literature, horse racing, other countries' traditions and costumes, and everyday life, among others.

Visual styleFray Mocho's visual aesthetic had influences of the romanticism and art nouveau styles at its first steps, then changing to art deco.

The rise of art nouveau in Argentina in the 1900s influenced not only magazines' visual styles but facades of private houses, and was quickly adopted by the middle class. That aesthetic renovation was also visible on typography, illustration and design of Fray Mocho'', as well as advertisement, facades of public buildings and even clothing in the Argentine society of that age.

Notable people
 Salvadora Medina Onrubia (1894-1972), Argentine writer

Notes

References

Political magazines published in Argentina
Argentine political satire
Satirical magazines published in Argentina
Defunct magazines published in Argentina
Defunct political magazines
Magazines established in 1912
Magazines disestablished in 1929
Magazines published in Buenos Aires
Spanish-language magazines
Weekly magazines